City of Darkness may refer to:

 City of Darkness (novel), a 1976 dystopian young adult novel by Ben Bova
 an alternative name for Kowloon Walled City